Jörg Osterloh (born 1967) is a German historian. His book, Nationalsozialistische Judenverfolgung im Reichsgau Sudetenland 1938-1945, discusses the Holocaust in the Sudetenland and is based on his 2004 doctorate at the University of Jena. Since 2008, he has worked as a research assistant at the Fritz Bauer Institute and lecturer at  Goethe University. Since 2009, he has edited the journal Einsicht. Bulletin des Fritz Bauer Instituts.

Works

The Greater German Reich and the Jews, ed. Osterloh and Wolf Gruner, 2010 and 2015

References

21st-century German historians
Historians of the Czech Republic
Historians of the Holocaust in Bohemia and Moravia
University of Jena alumni
Academic staff of Goethe University Frankfurt
1967 births
Living people